The 2022 FIFA World Cup was an international football tournament contested by the men's national teams of FIFA's member associations and 22nd edition of the FIFA World Cup. It took place in Qatar from 20 November to 18 December 2022, making it the first World Cup held in the Arab world and Muslim world, and the second held entirely in Asia after the 2002 tournament in South Korea and Japan.

This tournament was the last with 32 participating teams, with the number of teams being increased to 48 for the 2026 edition. To avoid the extremes of Qatar's hot climate, the event was held during November and December. It was held over a reduced time frame of 29 days with 64 matches played in eight venues across five cities. Qatar entered the event—their first World Cup—automatically as the host's national team, alongside 31 teams determined by the qualification process.

Argentina were crowned the champions after winning the final against the title holder France 4–2 on penalties following a 3–3 draw after extra time. It was Argentina's third title and their first since 1986, as well being the first nation from outside of Europe to win the tournament since 2002. French player Kylian Mbappé became the first player to score a hat-trick in a World Cup final since Geoff Hurst in the 1966 final and won the Golden Boot as he scored the most goals (eight) during the tournament. Argentine captain Lionel Messi was voted the tournament's best player, winning the Golden Ball. Teammates Emiliano Martínez and Enzo Fernández won the Golden Glove, awarded to the tournament's best goalkeeper, and the Young Player Award, awarded to the tournament's best young player, respectively. With 172 goals, the tournament set a new record for the highest number of goals scored with the 32-team format, with every participating team scoring at least one goal.

The choice to host the World Cup in Qatar attracted significant criticism, with concerns raised over the country's treatment of migrant workers, women and members of the LGBT community, as well as Qatar's climate, lack of a strong football culture, scheduling changes, and allegations of bribery for hosting rights and wider FIFA corruption.

Overview
The FIFA World Cup is a professional football tournament held between national football teams, Organised by FIFA. The tournament, held every four years, was first played in 1930 in Uruguay, and has been contested by 32 teams since the 1998 event. The tournament was contested with eight round-robin groups followed by a knockout round for 16 teams. The defending champions were France, who defeated Croatia 4–2 in the 2018 FIFA World Cup Final. The event was scheduled to take place under a reduced length, from 20 November to 18 December in Qatar. Being held in Qatar, it was the first World Cup tournament to be held in the Arab world. Spectators were not required to follow most COVID-19 pandemic restrictions such as social distancing, wearing masks, and negative tests.

Schedule
Unlike previous FIFA World Cups, which are typically played in June and July, because of Qatar's intense summer heat and often fairly high humidity, the 2022 World Cup was played in November and December. As a result, the World Cup was unusually staged in the middle of the seasons of many domestic association football leagues, which started in late July or August, including all of the major European leagues, which had been obliged to incorporate extended breaks into their domestic schedules to accommodate the World Cup. Major European competitions had scheduled their respective competitions group matches to be played before the World Cup, to avoid playing group matches the following year.

The match schedule was confirmed by FIFA in July 2020. The group stage was set to begin on 21 November, with four matches every day. Later, the schedule was tweaked by moving the Qatar vs Ecuador game to 20 November, after Qatar lobbied FIFA to allow their team to open the tournament. The final was played on 18 December 2022, National Day, at Lusail Stadium.

The matches for each group were allocated to the following stadiums:
 Groups A, B, E, F: Al Bayt Stadium, Khalifa International Stadium, Al Thumama Stadium, Ahmad bin Ali Stadium
 Groups C, D, G, H: Lusail Stadium, Stadium 974, Education City Stadium, Al Janoub Stadium

FIFA confirmed the group stage venue and kick-off times on 1 April 2022, following the draw. On 11 August, it was confirmed that Qatar vs Ecuador had been brought forward one day, now becoming the tournament's opening match, while Senegal vs Netherlands, which would have opened the tournament under the original schedule, had been reallocated to the freed-up timeslot.

Prize money
In April 2022, FIFA announced the prizes for all participating nations. Each qualified team received $1.5 million before the competition to cover preparation costs with each team receiving at least $9 million in prize money. This edition's total prize pool was $440 million, $40 million greater than the prize pool of the previous tournament.

Rule changes
The tournament featured new substitution rules whereby teams could make up to five substitutions in normal time, and an additional substitution in extra time. In addition, it was the first World Cup to feature concussion substitutions, whereby each team was permitted to use a maximum of one concussion substitute during a match. A concussion substitution did not count towards a team's quota of regular substitutions. Iranian goalkeeper Alireza Beiranvand suffered a concussion in his country's opening match against England and was replaced by Hossein Hosseini. This was the first use of a dedicated concussion substitute during a World Cup.

Host selection

The bidding procedure to host the 2018 and 2022 FIFA World Cups began in January 2009. National associations had until 2 February 2009 to register interest. Initially, 11 bids were made for the 2018 FIFA World Cup, but Mexico withdrew from proceedings, and Indonesia's bid was rejected by FIFA in February 2010 after the Indonesian Football Association failed to submit a letter of Indonesian government guarantee to support the bid.

After UEFA were guaranteed to host the 2018 event, members of UEFA were no longer in contention to host in 2022. There were five bids remaining for the 2022 FIFA World Cup: Australia, Japan, Qatar, South Korea, and the United States.
The 22-member FIFA Executive Committee convened in Zürich on 2 December 2010 to vote to select the hosts of both tournaments. Two FIFA executive committee members were suspended before the vote in relation to allegations of corruption regarding their votes. The decision to host the 2022 World Cup in Qatar, which was graded as having "high operational risk", generated criticism from media commentators. It was criticised by many as being part of the FIFA corruption scandals.

The voting patterns were as follows:

Host selection criticism

There have been allegations of bribery and corruption in the selection process involving FIFA's executive committee members. These allegations are being investigated by FIFA . In May 2011, allegations of corruption within the FIFA senior officials raised questions over the legitimacy of the World Cup 2022 being held in Qatar. The accusations of corruption were made relating to how Qatar won the right to host the event. A FIFA internal investigation and report cleared Qatar of any violation, but chief investigator Michael J. Garcia described FIFA's report on his enquiry as containing "numerous materially incomplete and erroneous representations."

In May 2015, Swiss federal prosecutors opened an investigation into corruption and money laundering related to the 2018 and 2022 World Cup bids. In August 2018, former FIFA president Sepp Blatter claimed that Qatar had used "black ops", suggesting that the bid committee had cheated to win the hosting rights. Some investigations found that Qatar sought an edge in securing hosting by hiring a former CIA officer turned private contractor, Kevin Chalker, to spy on rival bid teams and key football officials who picked the winner in 2010.

In September 2018, a delegation from al-Ghufran tribe lodged a complaint to FIFA's president to reject the establishment of the World Cup in Qatar unless its government restored the Qatari nationality to all those affected from the tribe and returned land allegedly stolen from them to build the sport facilities.

Qatar faced strong criticism for the treatment of foreign workers involved in preparation for the World Cup, with Amnesty International referring to "forced labour" and poor working conditions, while many migrant workers reported having to pay large "recruitment fees" to obtain employment. The Guardian newspaper reported that many workers were denied food and water, had their identity papers taken away from them, and that they were not paid on time or at all, making some of them in effect slaves. The Guardian estimated that up to 4,000 workers could die from lax safety and other causes by the time the competition was held. Between 2015 and 2021, the Qatari government adopted new labour reforms to improve working conditions, including a minimum wage for all workers and the removal of the kafala system. According to Amnesty International, however, living and working conditions of the foreign workers did not improve in the last years.

Qatar was the smallest nation by area ever to have been awarded a FIFA World Cup – the next smallest by area was Switzerland, host of the 1954 World Cup, which was more than three times as large as Qatar and only needed to host 16 teams instead of 32. Qatar also became only the second country (not including Uruguay and Italy, hosts of the first two World Cups) to be awarded a FIFA World Cup despite having never qualified for a previous edition: Japan was awarded co-hosting rights of the 2002 World Cup in 1996 without ever having qualified for the finals, although they qualified for the 1998 edition. Of the eight stadiums used in the tournament, six were located in the Doha metropolitan area, making it the first World Cup since 1930 in which most of the stadiums were in one city. While this decreased the distance that fans and players needed to commute, Qatar itself struggled to accommodate the numbers of arriving fans with its diminutive amount of space.

Due to Qatar's laws on alcohol consumption, World Cup organisers announced the creation of designated "sobering up" zones as an alternative to wide-scale arrests of intoxicated fans during the World Cup. Qatar's World Cup chief executive of the Supreme Committee for Delivery and Legacy, Nasser Al Khater, stated that the purpose of the designated sobering-up areas was to ensure the fans' safety. If a fan was sent to the "sobering up" zone, they were permitted to leave when they could display clearheaded behaviour. Multiple news agencies described the controversy as a "cultural clash" between social conservatism and Islamic morality against the "norms" of secular Western liberal democracies.

Cost of hosting the tournament
At an estimated cost of over $220 billion, it is the most expensive World Cup ever held to date; this figure is disputed by Qatari officials, including organising CEO Nasser Al Khater, who said the true cost was $8 billion, and other figures related to overall infrastructure development since the World Cup was awarded to Qatar in 2010.

Venues 

The first five proposed venues for the World Cup were unveiled at the beginning of March 2010. Qatar intended that the stadiums should reflect its history and culture, and for the designs to meet the following terms of reference: legacy, comfort, accessibility, and sustainability.

Their marketing included statements describing the stadiums as zero waste, and the upper tiers of the stadiums will be disassembled after the World Cup and donated to countries with less developed sports infrastructure. Qatar aspired to be compliant and certified by the Global Sustainability Assessment System (GSAS) for all the World Cup stadiums. All of the five stadium projects launched were designed by German architect Albert Speer & Partners. The Al Bayt and Al Wakrah stadiums were the only indoor stadiums of the eight used.

In an April 2013 report by Merrill Lynch, the organisers in Qatar requested that FIFA approve a smaller number of stadiums due to the growing costs. Bloomberg said that Qatar wished to cut the number of venues to eight or nine from the twelve originally planned. By April 2017, FIFA had yet to finalise the number of stadiums Qatar must have readied in five years' time. Qatar's Supreme Committee for Delivery and Legacy (SC) said it expected there would be eight in and near Doha, with the exception of Al Khor.

The most used stadium was the Lusail Stadium, which hosted 10 matches, including the final. The Al Bayt Stadium in Al Khor hosted nine matches. All but the nine matches hosted in Al Khor in this tournament were held within a  radius of the centre of Doha. In addition, the Khalifa, Al Thumama and Education City stadiums hosted eight matches each (Khalifa hosted the third place match, while Al Thumama and Education City hosted a quarter-final each) and the 974, Al Janoub and Ahmad bin Ali stadiums hosted seven matches each, including a round of 16 match each.

Stadium 974, formerly known as the Ras Abu Aboud Stadium, was the seventh FIFA World Cup 2022 venue to be completed by the SC. Its name comes from the number of shipping containers used in its construction and Qatar's international dialling code. The venue will be dismantled completely after the tournament – this stadium was the first temporary stadium ever used for a FIFA World Cup. All of the other stadiums used except Khalifa International were reduced in capacity by half.

The Qatari government employed about 50,000 security personnel including police departments and military forces from at least thirteen countries, including Poland, Germany, France, Kuwait, Jordan, Italy, Palestine, Spain, Pakistan, Turkey, USA, Saudi Arabia and the United Kingdom.

Stadiums

Team base camps 

Base camps were used by the 32 national squads to stay and train before and during the World Cup tournament. In July 2022, FIFA announced the hotels and training sites for each participating team. This World Cup was the most compact since the inaugural edition in 1930, with 24 of the 32 teams being within a  radius of each other, and are concentrated within the Doha area. It was the first Cup since 1930 in which players did not need to take flights to matches and could remain at the same training base throughout the entire tournament.

Teams

Qualification

FIFA's six continental confederations organised their own qualifying competitions. All 211 FIFA member associations were eligible to enter qualification. The Qatari national team, as hosts, qualified automatically for the tournament. However, the Asian Football Confederation (AFC) obliged Qatar to participate in the Asian qualifying stage as the first two rounds also act as qualification for the 2023 AFC Asian Cup. Since Qatar reached the final stage as winners in their group, Lebanon, the fifth-best second place team, advanced instead. France, the reigning World Cup champions also went through qualifying stages as normal.

Saint Lucia initially entered CONCACAF qualification but withdrew from it before their first match. North Korea withdrew from the AFC qualifying round due to safety concerns related to the COVID-19 pandemic. Both American Samoa and Samoa withdrew before the OFC qualification draw. Tonga withdrew after the 2022 Hunga Tonga–Hunga Ha'apai eruption and tsunami. Due to COVID-19 outbreaks in their squads, Vanuatu and Cook Islands also withdrew because of the travel restrictions.

Of the 32 nations qualified to play at the 2022 FIFA World Cup, 24 countries competed at the previous tournament in 2018. Qatar were the only team making their debut in the FIFA World Cup, becoming the first hosts to make their tournament debut since Italy in 1934. As a result, the 2022 tournament was the first World Cup in which none of the teams that earned a spot through qualification were making their debut. The Netherlands, Ecuador, Ghana, Cameroon, and the United States returned to the tournament after missing the 2018 tournament. Canada returned after 36 years, their only prior appearance being in 1986. Wales made their first appearance in 64 years – the longest ever gap for any team, their only previous participation having been in 1958.

Italy, four-time winners and reigning European champions, failed to qualify for a second successive World Cup for the first time in their history, losing in the qualification play-off semi-finals. The Italians were the only former champions and the highest ranked team in the FIFA Men's World Rankings that failed to qualify. Italy were also the fourth team to have failed to qualify for the upcoming World Cup after having won the previous UEFA European Championship, following Czechoslovakia in 1978, Denmark in 1994, and Greece in 2006. The previous World Cup hosts, Russia, were disqualified from competing due to the Russian invasion of Ukraine.

Chile, the 2015 and 2016 Copa América winners, failed to qualify for the second consecutive time. Nigeria were defeated by Ghana on away goals in Confederation of African Football (CAF) final playoff round, having qualified for the previous three World Cups and six out of the last seven. Egypt, Panama, Colombia, Peru, Iceland, and Sweden, all of whom qualified for the 2018 World Cup, did not qualify for the 2022 tournament. Ghana were the lowest ranked team to qualify, ranked 61st.

The qualified teams, listed by region, with numbers in parentheses indicating final positions in the FIFA Men's World Ranking before the tournament were:

AFC (6)
  (38)
  (20)
  (24)
  (50) (hosts)
  (51)
  (28)

CAF (5)
  (43)
  (61)
  (22)
  (18)
  (30)

CONCACAF (4)
  (41)
  (31)
  (13)
  (16)

CONMEBOL (4)
  (3)
  (1)
  (44)
  (14)

OFC (0)
 None qualified

UEFA (13)
  (2)
  (12)
  (10)
  (5)
  (4)
  (11)
  (8)
  (26)
  (9)
  (21)
  (7)
  (15)
  (19)

Draw

The final draw was held at the Doha Exhibition and Convention Center in Doha, Qatar, on 1 April 2022, 19:00 AST, prior to the completion of qualification. The two winners of the inter-confederation play-offs and the winner of the Path A of the UEFA play-offs were not known at the time of the draw. The draw was attended by 2,000 guests and was led by Carli Lloyd, Jermaine Jenas and sports broadcaster Samantha Johnson, assisted by the likes of Cafu (Brazil), Lothar Matthäus (Germany), Adel Ahmed Malalla (Qatar), Ali Daei (Iran), Bora Milutinović (Serbia/Mexico), Jay-Jay Okocha (Nigeria), Rabah Madjer (Algeria), and Tim Cahill (Australia).

For the draw, 32 teams were allocated into four pots based on the FIFA Men's World Rankings of 31 March 2022. Pot 1 contained host Qatar (who were automatically assigned to position A1) and the best seven teams. Pot 2 contained the next best eight teams, with the next best eight teams into pot 3. Pot 4 contained the five lowest-ranked teams, along with the placeholders for the two inter-confederation play-off winners and the UEFA Path A play-off winner. Teams from the same confederation could not be drawn into the same group except for UEFA teams, for which there was at least one and no more than two per group.

This principle also applied to the placeholder teams, with constraints applying based on the confederation of both potential winners of each play-off tie. The draw started with pot 1 and ended with pot 4, with each team selected then allocated into the first available group alphabetically. The position for the team within the group would then be drawn (for the purpose of the match schedule), with the pot 1 teams automatically drawn into position 1 of each group. The pots for the draw are shown below.

Squads

Before submitting their final squad for the tournament, teams named a provisional squad of up to 55 players. Teams were required to have their 55-player roster submitted to FIFA by 21 October. Teams were required to name their final squads by 13 November. In August 2022, FIFA increased the final squad size to 26 players from a total of 23 players at the 2018 edition. All teams had a total of 26 players in their final squads except for France, who decided not to replace Karim Benzema after he sustained an injury, and Iran, who chose 25 players.

Officiating

In May 2022, FIFA announced the list of 36 referees, 69 assistant referees, and 24 video assistant referees for the tournament. Of the 36 referees, FIFA included two each from Argentina, Brazil, England, and France.

For the first time women referees officiated games at a major men's tournament. France's Stéphanie Frappart, Salima Mukansanga from Rwanda, and Yoshimi Yamashita from Japan became the first female referees to be appointed to a men's World Cup. Frappart previously oversaw the 2019 FIFA Women's World Cup Final. They were joined by three female assistant referees, Neuza Back, Kathryn Nesbitt, and Karen Díaz Medina. Frappart then officially became the first ever female referee to officiate a World Cup match when she worked the Costa Rica vs Germany match in Group E on 1 December.

Gambian referee Bakary Gassama and Argentine assistant referee Juan Pablo Belatti were among the officials to serve at their third World Cup. Belatti was an assistant referee in the 2018 final. Other returning officials included referees César Arturo Ramos of Mexico and Janny Sikazwe of Zambia, and Iranian assistant referee Mohammadreza Mansouri.

On 15 December 2022, FIFA announced that Polish referee Szymon Marciniak would adjudicate the final.

Opening ceremony 

The opening ceremony took place on Sunday, 20 November 2022 at the Al Bayt Stadium in Al Khor, prior to the opening match of the tournament between hosts Qatar and Ecuador. It included appearances by Morgan Freeman and Ghanim Al-Muftah, along with performances by South Korean singer and BTS member Jungkook and Qatari singer Fahad Al Kubaisi. It was the first time that the Qur'an had been recited as part of the opening ceremony.

Group stage 

The group stage was played from 20 November to 2 December. Competing countries were divided into eight groups of four teams (groups A to H). Teams in each group played one another in a round-robin, where the top two teams advanced to the knockout stage.

Group A 

The first match of the tournament was held between Qatar and Ecuador in Group A. Ecuador had a disallowed goal in the opening minutes, but eventually won 2–0 with two goals from Enner Valencia. Qatar became the first host nation to lose their opening match at a World Cup. Many Qatar natives were seen leaving the game before the end, with ESPN reporting that two-thirds of the attendance had left. The other starting match in group A was won by the Netherlands 2–0 over Senegal. Cody Gakpo scored the opening goal in the 84th minute and Davy Klaassen added a second in stoppage time. Senegal faced Qatar in the third match of the group; Boulaye Dia capitalised on a slip by Boualem Khoukhi to put Senegal 1–0 ahead. Famara Diédhiou scored a second with a header, before Mohammed Muntari scored Qatar's first-ever goal at a World Cup to reduce the deficit back to one. Senegal eventually won the match 3–1 after an 84th-minute goal by Bamba Dieng. With this result, Qatar became the first team to be eliminated from the tournament, as well as becoming the first host nation to ever be knocked out of the tournament after two games. Gakpo scored his second goal of the tournament as the Netherlands led Ecuador; however, Valencia scored an equaliser in the 49th minute. The Netherlands won 2–0 against Qatar following goals by Gakpo and Frenkie de Jong to win the group, while Qatar attained the distinction of being the first home nation to lose all three group matches. Senegal faced Ecuador to determine the second knockout round qualifier. At the end of the first half, Ismaïla Sarr scored a penalty kick to put Senegal ahead. In the 67th minute, Moisés Caicedo scored an equaliser, but shortly after, Kalidou Koulibaly gave Senegal the victory. The win was enough to qualify Senegal as the runners-up of Group A.

Group B 

England completed a 6–2 victory over Iran. Iranian keeper Alireza Beiranvand was removed from the game for a suspected concussion before England scored three first-half goals. Mehdi Taremi scored in the second half after which England defender Harry Maguire was also removed for a concussion. Timothy Weah, of the United States, scored a first-half goal against Wales; however, the match finished as a draw after a penalty kick was won and scored by Gareth Bale. Iran defeated Wales 2–0 following a red card to Welsh goalkeeper Wayne Hennessey after he committed a foul outside of his penalty area. Substitute Rouzbeh Cheshmi scored the first goal eight minutes into stoppage time, followed by Ramin Rezaeian scoring three minutes later. England and the United States played to a 0–0 draw, with only four shots on target between them. England won the group following a 3–0 win over Wales with a goal by Phil Foden and two by Rashford. Christian Pulisic scored the winning goal as the United States defeated Iran 1–0 to qualify for the round of 16.

Group C 

Argentina took an early lead against Saudi Arabia after Lionel Messi scored a penalty kick after ten minutes; however, second-half goals by Saleh Al-Shehri and Salem Al-Dawsari won the match 2–1 for Saudi Arabia, a result described as "the biggest upset in the history of the World Cup." The match between Mexico and Poland ended as a goalless 0–0 draw after Guillermo Ochoa saved Robert Lewandowski's penalty kick attempt. Lewandowski scored his first career World Cup goal in a 2–0 win over Saudi Arabia four days later. Argentina defeated Mexico 2–0, with Messi scoring the opener and later assisting teammate Enzo Fernández who scored his first international goal. Argentina won their last game as they played Poland with goals by Alexis Mac Allister and Julián Álvarez which was enough to win the group; Poland qualified for the knockout stage on goal difference.

Group D 

The match between Denmark and Tunisia ended as a goalless draw; both teams had goals disallowed by offside calls. Danish midfielder Christian Eriksen made his first major international appearance since suffering a cardiac arrest at the UEFA Euro 2020. Defending champions France went a goal behind to Australia, after a Craig Goodwin goal within ten minutes. France, however, scored four goals, by Adrien Rabiot, by Kylian Mbappé, and two by Olivier Giroud to win 4–1. The goals tied Giroud with Thierry Henry as France's all-time top goalscorer. Mitchell Duke scored the only goal as Australia won against Tunisia. This was their first World Cup win since 2010. Mbappé scored a brace as France defeated Denmark 2–1. This was enough for France to qualify for the knockout round – the first time since Brazil in 2006 that the defending champions progressed through the opening round. Mathew Leckie scored the only goal as Australia defeated Denmark 1–0, qualifying for the knockout round as runners-up with the win. Wahbi Khazri scored for Tunisia against France in the 58th minute. Although Antoine Griezmann equalised in stoppage time it was overturned for offside. Tunisia finished third in the group, as they required a draw in the Denmark and Australia game.

Group E 

Group E began with Japan facing 2014 champions Germany. After an early penalty kick was converted by Germany's İlkay Gündoğan, Japan scored two second-half goals by Ritsu Dōan and Takuma Asano in a 2–1 upset win. In the second group match, Spain defeated Costa Rica 7–0. First-half goals by Dani Olmo, Marco Asensio, and Ferran Torres were followed by goals by Gavi, Carlos Soler, Alvaro Morata, and a second by Torres. This was the largest defeat in a World Cup since Portugal's victory over North Korea in the 2010 event by the same scoreline. Costa Rica defeated Japan 1–0, with Keysher Fuller scoring with Costa Rica's first shot on target of the tournament. Germany and Spain drew 1–1, with Álvaro Morata scoring for Spain and Niclas Füllkrug scoring for Germany. Morata scored the opening goal for Spain against Japan as they controlled the first half of the match. Japan equalised on Ritsu Doan before a second goal by Kaoru Mitoma was heavily investigated by VAR for the ball being out of play. The goal was awarded, and Japan won the group following a 2–1 win. Serge Gnabry scored on ten minutes for Germany against Costa Rica and they led until half-time. Germany required a win, and for Japan to not win their match, or for both teams to win their matches by a combined goal difference of at least 9 goals, to qualify. In the second half, goals by Yeltsin Tejeda and Juan Vargas gave Costa Rica a 2–1 lead, which would have qualified them into the knockout stages ahead of Spain. Germany scored three further goals—two by Kai Havertz and a goal by Niclas Fullkrug, ending in a 4–2 win for Germany—which was not enough to qualify them for the final stages. Japan won the group ahead of Spain.

Group F 

Group F's first match was a goalless draw between Morocco and Croatia. Canada had a penalty kick in the first half of their match against Belgium which was saved by Thibaut Courtois. Belgium won the match by a single goal by Michy Batshuayi. Belgium manager Roberto Martínez confirmed after the game that he believed Canada to have been the better team. Belgium lost 2–0 to Morocco, despite Morocco having a long-range direct free kick goal by Hakim Ziyech overturned for an offside on another player in the lead up to the goal. Two second-half goals from Zakaria Aboukhlal and Romain Saïss helped the Morocco win their first World Cup match since 1998. The match sparked riots in Belgium, with residents fires and fireworks being set off. Alphonso Davies scored Canada's first World Cup goal to give Canada the lead over Croatia. Goals by Marko Livaja, Lovro Majer, and two by Andrej Kramarić for Croatia completed a 4–1 victory. Morocco scored two early goals through Hakim Ziyech and Youssef En-Nesyri in their game against Canada and qualified following a 2–1 victory. Canada's only goal was an own goal by Nayef Aguerd. Croatia and Belgium played a goalless draw which eliminated Belgium, whose team was ranked second in the world, from the tournament.

Group G 

Breel Embolo scored the only goal in Switzerland's 1–0 defeat of Cameroon. Richarlison scored two goals as Brazil won against Serbia, with star player Neymar receiving an ankle injury. Cameroon's Jean-Charles Castelletto scored the opening goal against Serbia, but they were quickly behind as Serbia scored three goals by Strahinja Pavlović, Sergej Milinković-Savić, and Aleksandar Mitrović either side of half time. Cameroon, however, scored goals through Vincent Aboubakar and Eric Maxim Choupo-Moting, completing a 3–3 draw. An 83rd-minute winner by Casemiro for Brazil over Switzerland was enough for them to qualify for the knockout stage. Having already qualified, Brazil were unable to win their final group game, as they were defeated by Cameroon 1–0 following a goal by Vincent Aboubakar. He was later sent off for removing his shirt in celebrating the goal. Cameroon, however, did not qualify, as Switzerland defeated Serbia 3–2.

Group H 

Uruguay and South Korea played to a goalless draw. A goalless first half between Portugal and Ghana preceded a penalty converted by Cristiano Ronaldo to give Portugal the lead. In scoring the goal, Ronaldo became the first man to score in five World Cups. Ghana responded with a goal by André Ayew before goals by João Félix, and Rafael Leão by Portugal put them 3–1 ahead. Osman Bukari scored in the 89th minute to trail by a single goal, while Iñaki Williams had a chance to equalise for Ghana ten minutes into stoppage time, but slipped before shooting. The match finished 3–2 to Portugal. Ghanaian Mohammed Salisu opened the scoring against South Korea, with Mohammed Kudus following it up. In the second half, Cho Gue-sung scored a brace for South Korea, levelling the score. Mohammed Kudus scored again in the 68th minute, winning the match 3–2 for Ghana. Portugal defeated Uruguay 2–0 with two goals from Bruno Fernandes, advancing them to the knockout stage. The game's first goal appeared to have been headed in by Ronaldo, but the ball just missed his head. A controversial penalty decision was called late in the game, with a suspected handball from José María Giménez. Portugal led South Korea through Ricardo Horta after 10 minutes. However, goals by Kim Young-gwon and Hwang Hee-chan won the match 2–1 for South Korea. Giorgian de Arrascaeta scored two goals as Uruguay defeated Ghana 2–0. However, with South Korea winning, Uruguay required another goal to progress as they finished third on goals scored. Several Uruguay players left the pitch after the game surrounding the referees and followed them off the pitch.

Knockout stage 

In the knockout stage, if the scores were equal when normal playing time expired, extra time was played for two periods of 15 minutes each. This was followed, if required, by a penalty shoot-out to determine the winners.

Bracket

Round of 16 
The round of 16 was played from 3 to 7 December, which for the first time ever included teams from all five continents. Group A winners Netherlands scored goals through Memphis Depay, Daley Blind, and Denzel Dumfries as they defeated the United States 3–1, with Haji Wright scoring for the United States. Messi scored his third of the tournament alongside Julián Álvarez to give Argentina a two-goal lead over Australia, and despite an Enzo Fernández own goal from a Craig Goodwin shot, Argentina won 2–1. Olivier Giroud's goal and Mbappé's brace enabled France to have a 3–1 victory over Poland, with Robert Lewandowski scoring the lone goal for Poland from a penalty. England beat Senegal 3–0, with goals coming from Jordan Henderson, Harry Kane, and Bukayo Saka. Daizen Maeda scored for Japan against Croatia in the first half before a leveller from Ivan Perišić in the second. Neither team could find the winner, with Croatia defeating Japan 3–1 in a penalty shoot-out. Vinícius Júnior, Neymar, Richarlison, and Lucas Paquetá all scored for Brazil, but a volley from South Korean Paik Seung-ho reduced the deficit to 4–1. The match between Morocco and Spain finished as a goalless draw after 90 minutes, sending the match to extra time. Neither team could score a goal in extra time; Morocco won the match 3–0 on penalties. A hat-trick by Gonçalo Ramos led Portugal to defeat Switzerland 6–1, with goals from Portugal's Pepe, Raphaël Guerreiro, and Rafael Leão and from Switzerland's Manuel Akanji.

Quarter-finals 
The quarter-finals were played on 9 and 10 December. Croatia and Brazil ended 0–0 after 90 minutes and went to extra time. Neymar scored for Brazil in the 15th minute of extra time. Croatia, however, equalised through Bruno Petković in the second period of extra time. With the match tied, a penalty shootout decided the contest, with Croatia winning the shootout 4–2. In the second quarter-final match, Nahuel Molina and Messi scored for Argentina before Wout Weghorst equalised with two goals shortly before the end of the game. The match went to extra time and then penalties, where Argentina would go on to win 4–3. Morocco defeated Portugal 1–0, with Youssef En-Nesyri scoring at the end of the first half. Morocco became the first African and the first Arab nation to advance as far as the semi-finals of the competition. Despite Harry Kane scoring a penalty for England, it was not enough to beat France, who won 2–1 by virtue of goals from Aurélien Tchouaméni and Olivier Giroud and a late missed penalty by Kane, sending them to their second consecutive World Cup semi-final and becoming the first defending champions to reach this stage since Brazil in 1998.

Semi-finals 
The semi-finals were played on 13 and 14 December. Messi scored a penalty kick before Julián Álvarez scored twice to give Argentina a 3–0 victory over Croatia, their biggest win margin in the 2022 tournament, reaching their sixth final and first since 2014. Théo Hernandez scored after five minutes as France led Morocco for most of the game. Randal Kolo Muani scored in the 78th minute to complete a 2–0 victory for France over Morocco as they reached their second consecutive final.

Third place play-off 
The third place play-off was played on 17 December. Joško Gvardiol promptly scored for Croatia, with Achraf Dari equalising just 2 minutes later. Mislav Oršić scored the winner for Croatia as the match finished 2–1. Morocco earned 4th place, a record for the team and the best World Cup finish of any African or Arab nation.

Final 

The final was played on 18 December between Argentina and France. Both teams had won the event twice previously. Early goals from Lionel Messi and Ángel Di María gave Argentina, leading 2–0, a head start against the French. Despite multiple substitutions in the first half, France did not record a shot until after the 70th minute but were energised by additional substitutions in the 71st. A few minutes later, France were awarded a penalty as Randal Kolo Muani was brought down in the penalty area by Nicolás Otamendi. Mbappé scored the penalty and added a second goal less than two minutes later to equalise the scores. With the score tied at two goals apiece, the match went to extra time. Messi scored his second goal in the 108th minute, once again giving Argentina the lead. However, Mbappé was awarded a second penalty in the 115th minute after his shot hit the arm of Gonzalo Montiel. Mbappé scored his third goal, becoming the second player ever to complete a hat-trick in the final of a World Cup after Geoff Hurst for England in 1966. With the score tied at 3–3, the match was determined via a penalty shootout. Argentina won the final after scoring all of their penalties, winning 4–2. This marked their third World Cup win and their first since 1986. It also marked the first time that a South American team won the World Cup in 20 years and as Copa América champions.

Statistics

Goalscorers

Discipline
A player or team official is automatically suspended for the next match for the following offences:
 Receiving a red card (red card suspensions may be extended for serious offences)
 Receiving two yellow cards in two matches; yellow cards expire after the completion of the quarter-finals (yellow card suspensions are not carried forward to any other future international matches)

The following suspensions were served during the tournament:

Awards

The following World Cup awards were given at the conclusion of the tournament: the Golden Boot (top scorer), Golden Ball (best overall player) and Golden Glove (best goalkeeper).

Additionally, FIFA.com shortlisted 10 goals for users to vote on as the tournament's best. The award was won by  Richarlison for his goal in the group stage match against Serbia.

Marketing

Branding
The official emblem was designed by Lisbon-based Brandia Central branding agency and unveiled in September 2019, during simultaneous events at the Doha Tower, Katara Cultural Village amphitheatre, Msheireb Downtown Doha, and Zubarah. It was designed to resemble the tournament trophy, the infinity symbol, and the number "8", reflecting upon the "interconnected" event and the eight host stadiums. It also evoked imagery of shawls to signify the tournament's late fall scheduling, and contained waves resembling desert dunes. The typography of the emblem's wordmark incorporated kashida—the practice of elongating certain parts of characters in Arabic script to provide typographical emphasis.

Qatar has also used the tournament as an opportunity to promote its culture and heritage, featuring a range of activities and events to celebrate Qatari culture and traditions, as well as to promote its history and achievements during the sport event. H.E Ambassador Dr. Hend Al-Muftah, Permanent Representative of the State of Qatar to the United Nations Office at Geneva, explained to WIPO Magazine that Qatar is using the FIFA World Cup Qatar 2022™ to strengthen its national brand and international profile, strengthening its capabilities and build its reputation as a reliable international player and partner.

Merchandise

Electronic Arts released the 2022 FIFA World Cup DLC in their video game FIFA 23 on 9 November 2022. The expansion includes a World Cup tournament mode with all teams from the event, some theming, and a multiplayer online tournament mode. Instead of being connected to FIFA Ultimate Team, the DLC includes a "World Cup Live" mode, which lets players emulate that day's matches. Google released a mobile mini-game called "Mini Cup". For every live match of the World Cup, players could score penalties for their team, adding to the nation's total tally.

On 24 August 2022, the Panini Group produced themed stickers and a sticker album for a 14th consecutive World Cup. Collectors were meant to open player packs and use them to fill their sticker book with all 32 participating teams. This year, rare cards with coloured borders "parallels" could be found, and could be collected, traded, or sold.

On 12 April 2022, FIFA released an over-the-top media service and app revolving around the World Cup called FIFA+, where fans could play games, predict matches, and compete with others.

Broadcasting rights

In May 2022, Infantino projected that the 2022 FIFA World Cup could be the most-watched in its history, with a global audience of at least 5 billion. The 2018 tournament was seen by 3.57 billion across the tournament. The various controversies surrounding the World Cup in Qatar led to questions over how the tournament would be covered in the media, and whether they would be discussed or addressed during coverage. David Neal, executive producer for U.S. English rightsholder Fox Sports, stated that the broadcaster did not plan to cover issues that were "ancillary" to the tournament unless they "become prevalent and apparent", saying that "[viewers] don't come to us expecting us to be Real Sports with Bryant Gumbel, or E:60". This approach received a polarizing response from viewers, with some taking to social media to criticize the lack of focus on controversies, with others praising the sports-focused approach.

In February 2015, FIFA extended its media rights contracts in Canada and the United States with Bell Media (Canada), Fox (U.S. English), and NBCUniversal (U.S. Spanish) to last through 2026, without taking any  competing offers. The New York Times reported that this decision was likely intended as compensation for the rescheduling of the 2022 World Cup, as the new scheduling placed the tournament in competition with major professional sports leagues in North America, such as the National Football League. The group stage did benefit from matches occurring during the U.S. Thanksgiving holiday weekend (competing with traditional fixtures of American football), when the England–U.S. group stage match was seen by approximately 20 million viewers across both Fox and Telemundo, ranking among the highest-rated associated football broadcasts in U.S. history (the highest was a 2014 World Cup match that drew 24.7 million).

Sponsorship

Symbols

Mascot
The tournament's official mascot was unveiled on 1 April 2022, during the group stage draw. Its name is Laeeb, which is an Arabic word meaning "super-skilled player". The official website of FIFA says: "Laeeb will be known for his youthful spirit; spreading joy and confidence everywhere he goes", and the official backstory of the character, published there, claims that it comes from a parallel world where tournament mascots live, "a world where ideas and creativity form the basis of characters that live in the minds of everyone". Social media commentary compared La'eeb's appearance to Casper the Friendly Ghost or the Stay-Puft Marshmallow Man, or even the ghost of the construction workers who died building the stadiums and infrastructure.

Match ball

The official match ball, "Al Rihla", was unveiled on 30 March 2022. It was mainly inspired by the culture, architecture, iconic boats and flag of Qatar. In Arabic, the word Al Rihla means "the journey". The ball was designed with sustainability as a priority, making it the first ever official match ball created with water-based glues and inks. As "the game is getting faster" and "speeds up",  the Adidas ball has internal electronic sensors, allowing detection of its speed and position, updated 500 times per second and it has to be charged before each game. Two of the match balls were sent and returned from space by FIFA and Qatar Airways on a SpaceX falcon 9 suborbital mission for promoting the world cup.

The match ball for the 2022 FIFA World Cup Final was announced on 11 December 2022. It is a variation of the Al Rihla named the Adidas Al Hilm (a reference to "every nation's dream of lifting the FIFA World Cup").
Whilst the technical aspects of the ball are the same, the colour is different from the Al-Rihla balls used in the group stages and preceding knockout games, with a Gold Metallic, maroon, Collegiate Burgundy, and red design, a reference to the national colors of host nation Qatar and the golden colors shared by the Final's venue and the FIFA World Cup Trophy. It is the fifth special ball for FIFA World Cup final matches, after the +Teamgeist Berlin (2006), Jo'bulani (2010), Brazuca Final Rio (2014), and Telstar Mechta (2018).

Music

For the first time, a multi-song FIFA World Cup official soundtrack has been released, instead of one official song. The first song of the album is "Hayya Hayya (Better Together)", performed by Trinidad Cardona, Davido and AISHA, released on 1 April 2022 along with the music video. The second song is "Arhbo", performed by Gims and Ozuna, released on 19 August 2022 along with the music video. The third song is "The World Is Yours to Take" performed by American rapper Lil Baby, teamed up with Budweiser, released on 23 September 2022 along with the music video. The fourth song is "Light The Sky" performed by Nora Fatehi, Manal, Rahma Riad and Balqees, composed by RedOne and released on 7 October 2022 along with the music video.
A fifth song, "Tukoh Taka", performed by Nicki Minaj, Maluma and Myriam Fares, was released on 17 November 2022 along with the music video, serving as the official song of the FIFA Fan Festival. The final song is "Dreamers" by Jungkook of BTS released on 20 November 2022. It was performed with Fahad Al-Kubaisi during the tournament's opening ceremony.

Controversies

Criticism of the 2022 FIFA World Cup focused on Qatar's human-rights record, namely their treatment of migrant workers, women, and position on LGBT rights, leading to allegations of sportswashing. Others cited Qatar's climate, lack of a strong football culture, and allegations of bribery for hosting rights and wider FIFA corruption. Boycotts of the event were declared by several countries, clubs, and individual players, with former FIFA president Sepp Blatter twice stating that giving Qatar hosting rights was a "mistake".

The selection of Qatar as the host country was controversial. The controversies surrounding the World Cup in Qatar were described as a cultural conflict or "Clash of Civilizations" between authoritarian Islamic regimes and secular liberal democracies. Charlie Campbell of Time Magazine additionally noted the dispute as dually representative of the declining influence of the West in both football and geopolitics. The Economist provided a defence for FIFA's choice, stating that Qatar was "a more suitable country to host a big sporting event" than both China and Russia, who hosted the 2022 Winter Olympics and the 2018 World Cup respectively, and both of whom arguably had worse human rights records. Moreover, it added that "Western criticism" failed to "distinguish between truly repugnant regimes and merely flawed ones", and that many "indignant pundits" simply sounded as if they did "not like Muslims or rich people". The Qatari state-owned Al Jazeera news organization commented that Qatar's human rights positions had received selected, heightened criticism compared to other countries who had hosted similar events (such as Russia, China, and the United States), deeming the controversy to be hypocritical. Incumbent FIFA president Gianni Infantino defended the hosting.

A number of groups and media outlets expressed concern over the suitability of Qatar to host the event. Issues regarding from human rights, worker conditions ,the rights of LGBT fans, and the illegality of homosexuality in Qatar. In December 2020, Qatar said rainbow flags would be allowed at the 2022 FIFA World Cup. Qatari officials initially stated that they would not prohibit the display of pride flags at tournament venues, in accordance with FIFA's inclusivity policies, although the country still advised LGBT attendees to comply with the country's modesty and avoid public displays of affection. Hassan Abdulla al-Thawadi, chief executive of the country's 2022 World Cup bid, said that Qatar would permit alcohol consumption during the event, even though drinking in public was not permitted, as the country's legal system is based on Islamic law (sharīʿa). There were plans to allow the sale of alcohol inside stadiums and at fan villages. Normally, the sale of alcohol is restricted to non-Muslim guests at selected luxury hotels only.

However, in the months preceding the tournament, Qatar walked back on both commitments: security officials warned in April 2022 that pride flags could be confiscated to protect attendees from potential conflicts with attendees who do not support LGBT rights, and the sale of alcohol to fans within the stadiums was prohibited just days before the opening match. This also led to concerns about what other commitments may be rolled back. Also in the days preceding the opening of the competition, controversy arose around the change of rules surrounding the paid-for fans.

The climate conditions caused some to call hosting the tournament in Qatar infeasible, with initial plans for air-conditioned stadiums giving way to a potential date switch from summer to November and December. In May 2014, Sepp Blatter, who was FIFA president at the time of the selection but later banned for illegal payments, remarked that awarding the World Cup to Qatar was a "mistake" because of the extreme heat. While addressing delegates from African and Asian confederations, Blatter said allegations of corruption and some of the criticism, including those from sponsors, were "very much linked to racism and discrimination". The attendance figures at the matches also came under scrutiny as the reported crowd attendance was more than the stadium capacities despite games having visible empty seats.

Prior to the tournament, a reporter for Denmark's TV 2 was threatened by security during a live report from the Katara Cultural Village; the organising committee apologised, stating that they were "mistakenly interrupted". Tony O'Donoghue of Ireland's RTÉ also accused Qatari police of interrupting him while filming.

On 5 November 2022, The Sunday Times and the Bureau of Investigative Journalism published an investigation reporting that a "hack-for-hire" group from Indian hacking company "WhiteInt" based in Gurgaon had compromised the email accounts and other private communications channels of various politicians, reporters, and other prominent individuals that had been critical of Qatar's hosting of the World Cup. It was also reported that the group had been hired by Jonas Rey, private investigators based in Switzerland, which were in turn hired by Qatari officials.

In November 2022, just before the tournament kicked off, Blatter again stated that awarding the tournament to Qatar was a "mistake". He remarked that the nation was "too small of a country" to host the tournament and that "football and the World Cup are too big for it".

Migrant workers

There were criticisms of perceived human rights violations related to the organisation and hosting of the World Cup in Qatar. There had long been concerns for the state of human rights in Qatar, with the state accused of sportswashing in hosting the World Cup. A large concern in Qatar's hosting of the World Cup was the conditions of migrant workers brought in to build the required infrastructure, including indentured servitude and working conditions leading to deaths.

Move to November and December
Owing to the climate in Qatar, concerns were expressed over holding the World Cup in its traditional time frame of June and July. In October 2013, a task force was commissioned to consider alternative dates and report after the 2014 FIFA World Cup in Brazil. On 24 February 2015, the FIFA Task Force proposed that the tournament be played from late November to late December 2022, to avoid the summer heat between May and September and also avoid clashing with the 2022 Winter Olympics in February, the 2022 Winter Paralympics in March and Ramadan in April.

The notion of staging the tournament in November was controversial because it would interfere with the regular season schedules of some domestic leagues around the world. Commentators noted the clash with the Christian Christmas season was likely to cause disruption, whilst there was concern about how short the tournament was intended to be. FIFA executive committee member Theo Zwanziger said that awarding the 2022 World Cup to Qatar was a "blatant mistake".

Frank Lowy, chairman of Football Federation Australia, said that if the 2022 World Cup were moved to November and thus upset the schedule of the A-League, they would seek compensation from FIFA. Richard Scudamore, chief executive of the Premier League, stated that they would consider legal action against FIFA because a move would interfere with the Premier League's popular Christmas and New Year fixture programme. On 19 March 2015, FIFA sources confirmed that the final would be played on 18 December.

Critics condemned the Euro-centrism of these allegations, and questioned why global sporting events must be held within the traditional European summer season.

Bidding corruption allegations, 2014

Qatar faced growing pressure over its hosting of the World Cup in relation to allegations over the role of former top football official Mohammed bin Hammam played in securing the bid. A former employee of the Qatar bid team alleged that several African officials were paid $1.5 million by Qatar. She retracted her claims, but later said that she was coerced to do so by Qatari bid officials. In March 2014, it was discovered that disgraced former CONCACAF president Jack Warner and his family were paid almost $2 million from a firm linked to Qatar's successful campaign. The Federal Bureau of Investigation (FBI) is investigating Warner and his alleged links to the Qatari bid.

The Sunday Times published bribery allegations based on a leak of millions of secret documents. Five of FIFA's six primary sponsors, Sony, Adidas, Visa, Hyundai, and Coca-Cola, called upon FIFA to investigate the claims. Jim Boyce, vice-president of FIFA, stated he would support a re-vote to find a new host if the corruption allegations are proven. FIFA completed a lengthy investigation into these allegations and a report cleared Qatar of any wrongdoing. Despite the claims, the Qataris insisted that the corruption allegations were being driven by envy and mistrust while Sepp Blatter said it was fueled by racism in the British media.

In the 2015 FIFA corruption case, Swiss officials, operating under information from the United States Department of Justice, arrested many senior FIFA officials in Zürich, Switzerland and seized physical and electronic records from FIFA's main headquarters. The arrests continued in the United States, where several FIFA officers were arrested, and FIFA buildings were raided. The arrests were made on the information of at least a $150 million (USD) corruption and bribery scandal.

On 7 June 2015, Phaedra Almajid, the former media officer for the Qatar bid team, claimed that the allegations would result in Qatar not hosting the World Cup. In an interview published on the same day, Domenico Scala, the head of FIFA's Audit and Compliance Committee, stated that "should there be evidence that the awards to Qatar and Russia came only because of bought votes, then the awards could be cancelled."

Qatar diplomatic crisis in 2017

On 5 June 2017, Saudi Arabia, Egypt, Bahrain, the United Arab Emirates and Yemen cut diplomatic ties with Qatar, accusing it of destabilizing the region and supporting terrorist groups. Saudi Arabia, Yemen, Mauritania, the United Arab Emirates, Bahrain, and Egypt, in a letter, asked FIFA to replace Qatar as World Cup host, calling the country a "base of terrorism". In October 2017, Lieutenant General Dhahi Khalfan Tamim, deputy head of Dubai Police and General Security, wrote about the crisis on Twitter in Arabic: "If the World Cup leaves Qatar, Qatar's crisis will be over...because the crisis is created to get away from it". According to media reports, the message appeared to imply that the Saudi-led blockade of Qatar was only enacted due to Qatar hosting the world's biggest football event.

In reaction to media coverage of his tweet, Dhahi Khalfan tweeted: "I said Qatar is faking a crisis and claims it's besieged so it could get away from the burdens of building expensive sports facilities for the World Cup". UAE Minister of State for Foreign Affairs Anwar Gargash said Dhahi Khalfan had been misunderstood in media coverage. In response, Gargash clarified that Qatar's hosting of the World Cup "should include a repudiation of policies supporting extremism & terrorism".

Russian participation
On 9 December 2019, the World Anti-Doping Agency (WADA) handed Russia a four-year ban from all major sporting events, after RUSADA was found non-compliant for handing over manipulated lab data to investigators. The Russian national team were still permitted to enter qualification, as the ban only applied to the final tournament to decide the world champions. A team representing Russia, which used the Russian flag and anthem, could not participate under the WADA decision whilst the ban was active. The decision was appealed to the Court of Arbitration for Sport, and on 17 December 2020, Russian teams were banned from competing at world championships organized or sanctioned by a WADA signatory until 16 December 2022, the day before the third place play-off.

After the 2022 Russian invasion of Ukraine, Russia's participation was further thrown into doubt. On 24 February, the three teams in Russia's qualifying path  Czech Republic, Poland, and Sweden  announced their unwillingness to play any matches in Russian territory. Poland and Sweden extended the boycott on 26 February to any qualifying games, and the Czech Republic made the same decision one day later.

On 27 February 2022, FIFA announced a number of sanctions impacting Russia's participation in international football. Russia was prohibited from hosting international competitions, and the national team was ordered to play all home matches behind closed doors in neutral countries. Under these sanctions, Russia would not be allowed to compete under the country's name, flag, or national anthem; similarly to the Russian athletes' participation in events such as the Olympics, the team would compete under the abbreviation of their national federation, the Russian Football Union ("RFU"), rather than "Russia". The next day, FIFA decided to suspend Russia from international competitions "until further notice", including its participation in the 2022 FIFA World Cup.

LGBT rights

There are no LGBT rights in Qatar, with homosexuality as well as campaigning for LGBT rights criminalized. As such, when Qatar was selected to host the 2022 FIFA World Cup, the choice to do so in a restrictive nation saw much criticism, with several topics becoming the subject of controversy. The security of fans, as well as the homophobic football chants of certain nations, were points of discussion.

The main controversy came from a last-minute FIFA decision to hand out player punishments to European captains who had months earlier announced their intention to continue wearing rainbow-colored armbands (which began in 2020) in support of anti-discrimination; though not specifically in support of LGBT+ rights, nor targeting Qatar's lack, the rainbow symbol was deemed offensive to the hosts. Typically, kit violations incur a fine, which the teams had said they would pay; on the day of the first match involving one of the European teams, FIFA reportedly told the teams that they would receive a yellow card as a minimum.

Security officials at stadiums also confiscated items of rainbow clothing, flags featuring rainbows, whether Pride-related or not, and reportedly intimidated fans. American journalist Grant Wahl was briefly detained for wearing a t-shirt with a rainbow on it.

However many officials have stated that all people are welcome as long as they follow the public display of affection laws which apply to all people.

Women's rights

Discrimination against women was also criticized. Women in Qatar have few freedoms. The case of a female Mexican World Cup employee facing punishment for extramarital sex after reporting being sexually assaulted to Qatari authorities was also criticised, although many eyewitnesses have attested to the safety of women in Qatar.

Influence of Iran
In November 2022, there were reports suggesting that the government of Iran were working with Qatari officials to suppress anti-government protests at the 2022 FIFA World Cup, in light of the Mahsa Amini protests. Leaked documents and audio clips suggested that Iranian government officials were in correspondence with Qatari authorities in order to handle possible protesters.

In November 2022, the Qatari government revoked the visas of journalists from a London-based Iranian news channel, Iran International, known for being critical of the regime, who were seeking to cover the World Cup. On 21 November 2022, during the first group stage match from Group B, between Iran and England, attempts were reportedly made by the stadium's security forces to block Iranian fans who wore clothing or carried items bearing slogans that were deemed unsympathetic to the Islamic government of Iran.  These included t-shirts and signs with "Woman, Life, Freedom" embedded onto them, Iran's previous flags, or any slogans containing the name of Mahsa Amini. This crackdown continued throughout all of Iran's matches at the World Cup. In addition to removing fans from stadiums, reports showed that officials tried to suppress any filming or photography of possible protests. In one case, Qatari police detained Danish TV presenter, Rasmus Tantholdt, for filming fans with "Woman, Life, Freedom" slogans, some of whom who had been earlier abused by a group of pro-government supporters.

Alcohol ban
As part of the Qatari bid, alcohol was to be permitted to be consumed around the stadiums. This was in contradiction to Qatari law which prohibits public consumption of alcohol and limits its consumption to high-end hotels. It was agreed that Budweiser, FIFA's largest sponsor, would be permitted to sell their beer in designated areas in the stadium. Eight days before the tournament Qatari officials informed AB InBev, the owners of Budweiser, that the beer tents were to be moved to less prominent areas and were no longer authorized inside the stadiums but still within the stadium perimeter.

Two days before the tournament, on 18 November 2022, FIFA released a statement that sale points of beer would be removed from stadium perimeters in contradiction to both the Qatari bid and the earlier commitment when the sales were moved outside of the stadiums. FIFA's response was questioned as FIFA had forced recent World Cup hosts, such as Brazil, to change their laws to allow alcohol consumption at matches in line with sponsorship commitments. Alcohol was still permitted, however, inside the fan villages and inside the stadiums in the corporate hospitality boxes, leading to claims of double standards.

Regarding the last-minute Qatari ban on the sale of beer at the stadiums, Infantino proclaimed in his press conference: "I think personally, if for three hours a day you cannot drink a beer, you will survive."

Treatment of Jewish and Israeli visitors
Qatar had previously promised to provide Jewish tourists with cooked kosher food and public Jewish prayer services at the 2022 World Cup. However, shortly before the World Cup began, both were banned by Qatar, who claimed it could not secure the safety of Jews.

Qatar alleged that they could not "secure" the safety of publicly praying Jewish tourists, whilst many foreign Jews complained that they subsequently had no food available to eat. It was estimated that 10,000 religious Jews from Israel and around the world arrived to watch the World Cup in Qatar.

Whilst Jewish organisations complained of being unable to find cooked kosher food, the Israeli government said it was happy with the efforts made by Qatar to meet its requests, including kosher food, direct flights from Israel to Qatar, and temporary diplomatic representation in the country. A kosher kitchen under the supervision of Rabbi Mendy Chitrik was open in time for the first match. Rabbi Marc Schneier, president of The Foundation for Ethnic Understanding, said he had never asked the Qatari government for cooked food, and he had been the only person in communication with the Qataris regarding making the World Cup experience inclusive for Jews.

Multiple Israeli reporters at the tournament reported fans from Arab nations waving Palestinian flags and chanting anti-Israeli slogans. Some Israelis reported that they had been escorted out of restaurants when their nationality was revealed. The Israeli government warned its citizens traveling to the tournament to hide their Israeli identity out of safety concerns.

Accommodation
The Rawdat Al Jahhaniya fan village was criticised for its overpriced "night cabins" (£185 per night) made out of shipping containers. Tourists complained that the air conditioners in the cabins did not function well, facilities were falling apart, and the sleeping experience did not match their expectations. The BBC reported that the tent accommodation at the Qetaifan Island fan village got criticism for having brown-colored tap water and no air conditioning other than a standing fan. The tent village in Al Khor was criticized for having inconvenient transportation, a lack of alcohol, long waits to check in, and no locks on the tents. The lack of suitable and affordable accommodation raised demand for daily shuttle flights from neighboring areas, such as Dubai, that had adequate numbers of hotel rooms.

Reception

See also
 FIFA World Cup
 FIFA World Cup hosts
 2021 FIFA Arab Cup
 2023 FIFA Women's World Cup

Notes

References

External links

Post match summary reports

 
2022 in association football
2022–23 in Qatari football
Association football controversies
December 2022 sports events in Qatar
2022
2022 FIFA World Cup
November 2022 sports events in Qatar
Sport in Qatar
Sports events affected by the 2022 Russian invasion of Ukraine